Interboro Theatre was built in the 1920s and originally called the Interborough for a rapid transit route expansion that never came to pass. It was at 3462 East Tremont Avenue between Barkley Boulevard and Eastern Boulevard, now Bruckner, in the Throggs Neck section of The Bronx, New York. The first movie shown was Seventh Heaven in 1927. It hosted a variety of silent films and shows. A lice problem led to it becoming known as "The Itch". As it competed with television various draws were offered to get people in the door. It closed in 1995 and became a market and offices for the board of education.

References

Sources 
The Bronx Times Reporter July 13, 1995
Interboro Theatre Cinema Treasures
photo of the Interboro
Lloyd Ultan The beautiful Bronx (1920-1950)  Bronx County Historical Society - 1979 - 192 pages
Bill Twomey [The Bronx: In Bits and Pieces] - Page 5 2007 - 289 pages

Theatres in the Bronx
1920s establishments in New York City
Throggs Neck, Bronx